Vicino da Ferrara (1432–1509) was an Italian painter of the 15th-16th century. He is suspected to be identical to Baldassare d'Este from Reggio Emilia, also known as Baldassare da Reggio.

References

Gallery

15th-century Italian painters
Italian male painters
16th-century Italian painters
Painters from Ferrara
1432 births
1509 deaths